Víctor Hugo Marulanda Velásquez (born 3 February 1971 in Medellín) is a retired male football defender from Colombia.

Career
Marulanda was a university student while playing for Atlético Nacional. He played for the Colombia national football team at the 1992 Summer Olympics in Barcelona, Spain, wearing the #5 jersey. After retiring from football, Victor Marulanda became president of Atlético Nacional, position he held until he was dismissed from his charge in 2010.

References

External links
 

1971 births
Living people
Colombian footballers
Footballers from Medellín
Association football defenders
Footballers at the 1992 Summer Olympics
Olympic footballers of Colombia
Colombia under-20 international footballers
Categoría Primera A players
Peruvian Primera División players
Atlético Nacional footballers
Deportivo Pereira footballers
Club Alianza Lima footballers
Colombian expatriate footballers
Expatriate footballers in Peru